Czechoslovak Airlines Flight 001  was an Ilyushin Il-18B four engine turboprop airliner, registered OK-NAB, which was operating as a scheduled domestic passenger flight from Prague's Ruzyně airport to Bratislava-Ivanka Airport, both in Czechoslovakia, which crashed into the Zlaté Piesky (Golden Sands) Lake while attempting to land in Bratislava on July 28, 1976. All 6 crew members and 70 out of 73 passengers died.

Crash

The flight departed Prague airport at 8:52 (CEST) and proceeded routinely to Bratislava. At 9:35:10 (CEST) the flight was cleared by Bratislava tower to land on runway 22. As they approached the runway, the crew inadvertently set thrust reversal at the no. 2 and no. 3 engine (inboard engines) while still airborne. The thrust reversal caused the no. 3 engine to fail and the crew then inadvertently feathered the no. 4 prop, losing all thrust on the right side of the aircraft.

Investigation

The investigators published  the causes as follows:
 Use of thrust reversal at altitude under .
 Improper manipulation of the thrust levers of the inner engines.
 Reducing speed under the allowed limit on final approach.
 Erroneous feathering of the engine number 4 propeller.
 Failure to bank the plane towards the working engines side.
 The immediate cause was the attempt to start engine number 4 at low speed and altitude.

Rescue operation
The plane crashed into a lake in a densely populated area and rescue operations started immediately after the crash. Svazarm divers tried to help, but most passengers drowned or died due to the impact forces. Initially, four passengers were pulled out alive; one passenger later died in the hospital.

Controversy
A surviving passenger later claimed in an interview that flight captain requested emergency landing in Brno but it was rejected because of the Vietnamese delegation visiting the city and an emergency landing would harm the image of the country. He also claimed that Vienna airport offered an emergency landing permission but communist authorities rejected it. It is unclear how a surviving passenger would be aware of the captain's actions during the flight, or how searching for an alternate emergency landing site relates to an unstabilized approach with inadvertent thrust reversal deployment at Bratislava.

See also

List of accidents and incidents involving commercial aircraft
TABSO Flight 101 – Ilyushin Il-18B crash at Bratislava in 1966

References

External links
 Information about the plane crash
 GoogleMap aerial view of Bratislava airport and accident site

Airliner accidents and incidents caused by pilot error
Aviation accidents and incidents in Czechoslovakia
Aviation accidents and incidents in Slovakia
Aviation accidents and incidents in 1976
001
1976 in Czechoslovakia
Accidents and incidents involving the Ilyushin Il-18
July 1976 events in Europe